Brian John Slocum (born March 27, 1981) is an American former Major League Baseball right-handed pitcher who played for the Cleveland Indians in 2006 and 2008.

Amateur career
A native of New Rochelle, New York, Slocum was named MVP by the Archdiocesan of New York and Westchester County Player of the Year as a senior at Iona Prep (New York) in 1999, and was named one of the top 12 high school pitchers in the United States. After high school, he was drafted by the Minnesota Twins in the 14th round of the 1999 Major League Baseball Draft, but chose to attend Villanova University. 

In , Slocum was named third-team freshman All-American by Baseball America and Louisville Slugger freshman All-America honorable mention at Villanova. In 2001, he played collegiate summer baseball with the Cotuit Kettleers of the Cape Cod Baseball League. In , he was rated the #1 prospect in Pennsylvania and 40th nationally entering the 2002 draft by Baseball America. He compiled a 10–7 record with a 3.31 ERA, 128 strikeouts, and 68 walks in 155 innings in 3 years at Villanova. The Cleveland Indians selected him in the 2nd round of the 2002 Major League Baseball Draft and he was signed in June of that year.

Professional career

Cleveland Indians
In November , Cleveland added him to their 40-man roster. In , Slocum made his major league debut at Kansas City on April 22, pitching 2 innings, giving up 2 runs, walking 2, and striking out 2. He became a free agent after the  season on November 3.

Pittsburgh Pirates
On December 4, 2008, Slocum signed a minor league contract with the Pittsburgh Pirates organization. After beginning the season with the Indianapolis Indians, Slocum was released on July 14, 2009.

Southern Maryland Blue Crabs
Slocum signed with the Southern Maryland Blue Crabs of the Atlantic League of Professional Baseball for the 2011 season. He pitched in 15 games for the club, notching a 4.08 ERA and 4–4 record with 51 strikeouts over 82.1 innings pitched.

References

External links

1981 births
Living people
Akron Aeros players
Baseball players from New York (state)
Buffalo Bisons (minor league) players
Cleveland Indians players
Cotuit Kettleers players
Indianapolis Indians players
Iona Preparatory School alumni
Kinston Indians players
Leones del Caracas players
American expatriate baseball players in Venezuela
Mahoning Valley Scrappers players
Major League Baseball pitchers
Mesa Solar Sox players
Southern Maryland Blue Crabs players
Sportspeople from New Rochelle, New York
Villanova Wildcats baseball players